The Topdivisie is the premier  futsal league in the Netherlands, organized by the Royal Dutch Football Association.

Champions

References

External links
futsalplanet.com

 

Futsal competitions in the Netherlands
futsal
Netherlands
1968 establishments in the Netherlands
Sports leagues established in 1968